EGM may refer to:

 Earth Gravitational Model
 An Egg's Guide to Minecraft, a British animated web series.
 Electrogram, an electrical recording of an organ.
 Electronic gaming machine
 Electronic Gaming Monthly, an American video game magazine.
 Empire Gallantry Medal, a British civil award.
 Extraordinary general meeting
 Seghe Airport (IATA code), in the Solomon Islands.
 Benamanga language, ISO 639 code .